Oliver James Morris (fourth ¼ 1916 – 20 September 1944) was a Welsh rugby union and professional rugby league footballer who played in the 1930s and 1940s.

Background
Oliver James Morris' birth was registered in Llanelli district, Wales. He was a Sergeant Major, later a Lieutenant, in the British Army (1st battalion of the Welch Regiment (note archaic spelling)) during World War II, and he was killed aged 27 in Northern Italy, whilst fighting on the Gothic Line, during the Italian Campaign.

Rugby Union
Morris started his Rugby union career with Llanelli RFC but became a key part of the Pontypridd RFC team in the mid-to-late 1930s as their Fly-half. Morris became the first player from the Pontypridd club to ‘go north’ in November 1937. Weighing just nine and a half stones, there was great doubts about his ability to make it in professional rugby league.

Rugby League

International honours
Oliver Morris won 5 caps for Wales (RL) in 1938–1941 while at Hunslet, and Leeds.

Championship final appearances
Oliver Morris played  in Hunslet's 8-2 victory over Leeds in the Championship Final during the 1937–38 season at Elland Road, Leeds on Saturday 30 April 1938.

Challenge Cup Final appearances
Oliver Morris played  in Leeds' 19-2 victory over Halifax in the 1940–41 Challenge Cup Final during the 1940–41 season at Odsal Stadium, Bradford, in front of a crowd of 28,500, and played  in the 15-10 victory over Halifax in the 1941–42 Challenge Cup Final during the 1941–42 season at Odsal Stadium, Bradford, in front of a crowd of 15,250.

Other notable matches
Oliver Morris played  for Northern Command XIII against a Rugby League XIII at Thrum Hall, Halifax on Saturday 21 March 1942.

Club career
Oliver Morris made his début for Leeds against Broughton Rangers at The Cliff, Broughton, Salford on Saturday 26 August 1939.

Death
During the war, Morris became a Lieutenant in the Welch Regiment, and was killed in Italy on 21 September 1944 aged twenty-seven.

Genealogical information
Oliver Morris' marriage to Muriel M. (née Walker) was registered during fourth ¼ 1941 in Leeds district.

References

External links
(archived by web.archive.org) Profile at ponty.net
(archived by web.archive.org) True Heroes Remembered

1916 births
1944 deaths
Military personnel from Carmarthenshire
British Army personnel killed in World War II
Castleford Tigers players
Hunslet F.C. (1883) players
Llanelli RFC players
Leeds Rhinos players
Northern Command XIII rugby league team players
Pontypridd RFC players
Rugby league players from Llanelli
Rugby league five-eighths
Rugby union players from Llanelli
Wales national rugby league team players
Welch Regiment officers
Welsh rugby league players
Welsh rugby union players